The 2018 NHL Stadium Series (officially the 2018 Coors Light NHL Stadium Series for sponsorship reasons) was a regular season National Hockey League (NHL) game played outdoors, part of the Stadium Series of games held at football or baseball stadiums. The Washington Capitals defeated the Toronto Maple Leafs, 5–2, at Navy–Marine Corps Memorial Stadium, the home stadium of the U.S. Naval Academy in Annapolis, Maryland, on March 3, 2018.

This was the only game in the Stadium Series scheduled for the 2017–18 season (as opposed to multiple games in 2014 and 2016), and marked the first appearance of a Canadian team in the Stadium Series.

Background
NHL commissioner Gary Bettman said the 2018 Stadium Series game is the start of a unique partnership with the U.S. military in which the NHL plans to host outdoor games at military service academies around the United States. In the fall of 2016, the NHL and the New York Rangers explored the possibility of holding an outdoor game at Michie Stadium on the campus of the U.S. Military Academy in West Point, New York.

Game summary

Washington's Alexander Ovechkin scored his 40th goal of the season, while Nicklas Backstrom, Evgeny Kuznetsov and John Carlson each had a goal and two assists. With ten minutes left in the third period, a power outage at Navy–Marine Corps Memorial Stadium suspended play for about 15 minutes. Despite the power failure delay, the Capitals went on to win the game 5–2. In addition to the Ovechkin goal, the other Capitals players who scored were Evgeny Kuznetsov, Nicklas Backstrom, John Carlson and Jakub Vrana. Nazem Kadri and Zach Hyman scored the Maple Leafs' goals.

Number in parentheses represents the player's total in goals or assists to that point of the season.

Team rosters

 Philipp Grubauer dressed as the back-up goaltender for Washington and did not enter the game.

Scratches
Toronto Maple Leafs: Connor Carrick, Matt Martin, Josh Leivo
Washington Capitals: Madison Bowey, Jakub Jeřábek, Alex Chiasson, Travis Boyd

Television
The game was televised in the United States on NBC, and in Canada as part of the Hockey Night in Canada coverage that was simulcast of both CBC and Sportsnet, and in French on TVA Sports.

To accommodate NBC's preferred 8 p.m ET. start time for the Stadium Series game, HNIC had an irregular schedule on this particular Saturday: the Montreal Canadiens' game against the Boston Bruins was played earlier at 5 p.m., the Ottawa Senators at Arizona Coyotes contest (on City) also took place at 8 p.m. instead of the normal 7 p.m. start time for the early games, and the late doubleheader game featuring the New York Rangers at the Edmonton Oilers was pushed to 10:30 p.m. ET.

Due to the power outage delay, NBC switched the final minutes of the game to NBCSN at 11 p.m. ET, as to prevent local newscasts and Saturday Night Live from being delayed. while CBC shifted the Rangers–Oilers game to Sportsnet.

References

NHL Stadium Series
Stadium Series
2018 in ice hockey
2018 in sports in Maryland
Ice hockey in Maryland
Toronto Maple Leafs games
Washington Capitals games
NHL Stadium Series
Sports competitions in Maryland
Sports in Annapolis, Maryland